Batken (also called Batkent) is a town in southwestern Kyrgyzstan, on the southern fringe of the Fergana Valley. It is the administrative seat of Batken Region. Since 2000, it is a city of regional significance, i.e. not part of a district. However, it is still the administrative seat of Batken District. The population of the town proper was 15,805.

History
The name Batkent is from the Iranian language of Sogdian and means "The city of wind". Batken became the administrative headquarters of the youngest of Kyrgyzstan's seven regions, created from the three westernmost districts of Osh Region in 1999, after concerns over radical Islamist activities in neighboring Tajikistan and Uzbekistan led to demands for a more direct and visible governmental presence in this remote and mountainous region. Batken Airport links the town with Bishkek. Since 2000, there is a small university in Batken.

The 2022 Kyrgyzstan-Tajikistan clashes has heavily damaged the town, which has been subject to shelling.

Population

Climate
Batken has a cold steppe climate (Köppen climate classification: BSk), bordering on a Mediterranean climate (Csa) and a continental Mediterranean climate (Dsa). About  of precipitation falls annually.

References
 

Populated places in Batken Region